Bo Ying was a consort to the sixth-century BC Chu ruler, King Ping, and mother of his successor, King Zhao.

Biography
Bo Ying was a daughter of the ruler of Qin. The Biographies of Exemplary Women states that Bo Ying's father was Duke Mu of Qin, but he reigned nearly 100 years earlier than her husband King Ping of Chu, so it is generally accepted that she was a daughter of Duke Ai.

The Zuo zhuan and Shiji record that she was betrothed to the heir of Chu, but the official who negotiated her marriage, Fei Wuji, persuaded the Chu king to marry her himself. Bo Ying married the king on her arrival in Chu and later gave birth to a son named Xiong Zhen. Bo Ying's marriage is one of very few between Chu and Qin state to have been recorded.

Bo Ying's son became king of Chu in 516 BCE. In 506, Helu of Wu captured the Chu capital, and Bo Ying's son fled with a younger sister. The Biographies of Exemplary Women records that Helu attempted to rape Bo Ying and other members of the harem, but Bo Ying resisted with a knife and lectured him on morality. Helu was ashamed and retreated, and Chu was later liberated by Qin.

Family
Father: Duke Ai of Qin (536 — 501 BCE)
Husband: King Ping of Chu (528 — 516 BCE)
Son: King Zhao of Chu (515 — 489 BCE)

References

6th-century BC Chinese women
6th-century BC Chinese people
Chinese royal consorts
Year of birth unknown
Year of death unknown
Qin state people